A total 21 Venezuelan athletes participated in 9 sports at the 2010 Summer Youth Olympics in Singapore.

Medalists

Boxing

Boys

Diving

Boys

Girls

Fencing

Group Stage

Knock-Out Stage

Gymnastics

Artistic Gymnastics

Boys

Girls

Judo

Individual

Team

Swimming

Boys

Girls

Tennis

Singles

Doubles

Triathlon

Girls

Men's

Mixed

Weightlifting

Wrestling

Freestyle

References

External links
Competitors List: Venezuela

Nations at the 2010 Summer Youth Olympics
2010 in Venezuelan sport
Venezuela at the Youth Olympics